South Korean girl group Dreamcatcher have released three studio albums, nine extended plays, three single albums and 17 digital singles.

Studio albums

Single albums

Extended plays

Singles

Collaborations

Soundtrack appearances

Compilation appearances

Other charted songs

Notes

References

D
Discographies of South Korean artists
K-pop music group discographies